The 1996–1997 Bulgarian protests, or the Bulgarian winter was a wave of violent demonstrations and strikes nationwide in Bulgaria for a month from December 1996 to January 1997, fuelled by devaluation of the economic and economic turmoil. Countrywide and weekly demonstrations continued demanding the resignation of the BSP government of Zhan Videnov. Nationwide strikes escalated into violence as protesters even stormed government buildings. On 21 January, Zhan Videnov resigned despite further social unrest and widespread protests throughout Sofia and long acts of protest nationwide.

See also
 2020 Bulgarian protests

References

1996 protests
1997 protests
Protests in Bulgaria